Malpas is a surname. Notable people with the surname include:

Charles Malpas (1899–1982), Australian inventor and businessman
Jeff Malpas, Australian philosopher
Jodi Ellen Malpas, British writer
Maurice Malpas, Scottish footballer
Robert Malpas (born 1927), British engineer and businessman